Sesamin is a lignan isolated from the bark of Fagara plants and from sesame oil. It has been used as a dietary fat-reduction supplement. Its major metabolite is enterolactone, which has an elimination half life of less than 6 hours. Sesamin and sesamolin are minor components of sesame oil, on average comprising only 0.14% of the oil by mass.

See also 
 Sesamol, another phenolic component of sesame oil

References 

CYP3A4 inhibitors
Phenol antioxidants
Lignans
Benzodioxoles
Sesame